Rodney Alan "The Sheriff" Buford (born November 2, 1977) is an American former professional basketball player who last played for the London Lightning of the National Basketball League of Canada. He played college basketball for the Creighton Bluejays.

Buford played collegiately for Creighton University and was selected by the NBA's Miami Heat in the second round (53rd overall) of the 1999 NBA Draft. After seeing limited playing time during his rookie season with the Heat, Buford moved to Italy starting the season with Basket Rimini, but joined the Philadelphia 76ers in December for the 2000–01 season. He then moved on to the Memphis Grizzlies, the Sacramento Kings, and finally the New Jersey Nets. Buford averaged 6.4 points per game in his NBA career.

Buford played overseas for the Greek European giant Panathinaikos BC during the 2002–03 season. He started the 2006–07 season in the Euroleague with the Maccabi Tel Aviv basketball club from Israel, but he was released in December due to discipline violations and poor form. After a few months, it was discovered that he had failed a drug test during his time in Maccabi Tel Aviv, his third violation in his career. He recently played for the Ukrainian team Azovmash Mariupol, a team for which he played the 2005–06 season, after being banned by FIBA for testing positive in use of cannabis before a Euroleague game while still playing for Maccabi Tel Aviv. Consequently, he left the team in February 2007 after playing just one game. In March 2009 he played two games in Lebanon for Al Riyadi.

At the start of the 2009–10 season, he moved to Eisbären Bremerhaven of Germany's highest division Basketball Bundesliga. On 24 December 2009, Buford traveled to the U.S. to attend to family business. He agreed to return in early January, but was not on the plane with which he was scheduled to arrive. All attempts by the team to contact him were unsuccessful and his contract was dissolved on 11 January 2010.

On September 19, 2011, it was announced that Buford had signed a deal with the Halifax Rainmen of the National Basketball League of Canada to play for the 2011–12 season.  However, on November 14, the Rainmen traded him to the London Lightning for Tyrone Levett.

References

External links
Career at Eurobasket.com
Career at 1gsports.com

1977 births
Living people
AEL Limassol B.C. players
American expatriate basketball people in Canada
American expatriate basketball people in China
American expatriate basketball people in Cyprus
American expatriate basketball people in Germany
American expatriate basketball people in Greece
American expatriate basketball people in Israel
American expatriate basketball people in Italy
American expatriate basketball people in Lebanon
American expatriate basketball people in Ukraine
American expatriate basketball people in Venezuela
American men's basketball players
Basketball players from Milwaukee
Basket Rimini Crabs players
BC Azovmash players
Creighton Bluejays men's basketball players
Dakota Wizards (CBA) players
Eisbären Bremerhaven players
Greek Basket League players
Halifax Rainmen players
London Lightning players
Maccabi Tel Aviv B.C. players
Memphis Grizzlies players
Miami Heat draft picks
Miami Heat players
New Jersey Nets players
Pallacanestro Virtus Roma players
Panathinaikos B.C. players
Philadelphia 76ers players
Sacramento Kings players
Shooting guards
Sioux Falls Skyforce (CBA) players
Al Riyadi Club Beirut basketball players